The list of shipwrecks in October 1942 includes all ships sunk, foundered, grounded, or otherwise lost during October 1942.

1 October
For the sinking of the British cargo ship Siam II on this day, see the entry for 30 September 1942.

2 October

3 October
For the sinking of the American tanker Esso Williamsburg on this day, see the entry for 22 September 1942

4 October

5 October

6 October

7 October

8 October

9 October

10 October

11 October

12 October

13 October

14 October

15 October

16 October

17 October

18 October

19 October
For the loss of USS O'Brien on this day, see the entry for 15 September 1942.

20 October

21 October

22 October

23 October

24 October
For the foundering of the Norwegian cargo ship SS Vestland on this day, see the entry for 15 January 1942.

25 October

26 October

27 October

28 October

29 October

30 October

31 October

Unknown date

Notes

References

1942-10